John Forman was a Protestant martyr burned at the stake in East Grinstead, England, on 18 July 1556 along with Thomas Dungate (or Dougate) and Anne Tree (or Try).

References

16th-century Protestant martyrs
Year of birth unknown
1556 deaths
People executed by the Kingdom of England by burning
Executed British people
People executed for heresy
People executed under Mary I of England
Protestant martyrs of England